Bisse Fredrik Eric Albert Unger (born 17 February 1994) is a Swedish former child actor, well known for his role as Per in Håkan Bråkan & Josef.

Selected filmography
1999 - En häxa i familjen
2002 - Alla älskar Alice
2002 - Outside Your Door
2002 - Bella – bland kryddor och kriminella (TV)
2002/2003 - Tusenbröder (TV)
2004 - Håkan Bråkan & Josef
2006 - Tusenbröder – Återkomsten
2006 - Mäklarna (TV)
2007 - Se upp för dårarna
2007 - Arn – The Knight Templar
2008 - Allt flyter

References

External links
 

1994 births
Swedish male child actors
Swedish male film actors
Swedish male television actors
Living people